Daisy Bacon (May 23, 1898 – March 1, 1986) was an American pulp fiction magazine editor and writer, best known as the editor of Love Story Magazine from 1928 to 1947.

Early life
Daisy Bacon was born in Union City, Pennsylvania. One of her great-uncles, Dr. Almon C. Bacon, was the founder of Bacone College in Oklahoma.

Career
Daisy Bacon started working in publishing at Street & Smith as an advice columnist, before becoming editor of several of their pulp magazines. She began editing Love Story in 1928, and stayed in that position until the magazine's run ended in 1947. "In her pages, she offers to the average woman – not a flight from actual life — but a heightened reality," explained one profile in 1942, noting that the magazine's circulation was between two and three million readers a month. She also edited Smart Love Stories, Detective Stories, The Shadow, and Doc Savage (the latter two, superhero adventure series).

As a writer, she published several stories and essays, and a how-to manual, Love Story Writer (1953). In the 1960s, she launched her own imprint, Gemini Books.

On romance in mid-twentieth century America, she noted that "It is better for girls to acquire careers first, husbands afterward," and "financial independence for the wife is an ideal basis for marriage. To be singled out by a girl with a good job is the highest form of flattery for a man. She does not need his support. Therefore she loves him for himself."

Personal life
Daisy Bacon's unmarried status while editing a magazine about romance was often remarked upon, along with her tall slim figure and her stylish wardrobe. She died in 1986, aged 87 years, in Port Washington, New York. In 2016 the Baxter Estates Village Hall in Port Washington held an exhibit about Bacon, including her desk, photographs, manuscripts, and typewriter. A biography of Bacon, Queen of the Pulps: The Reign of Daisy Bacon and Love Story Magazine, was published in 2019.

References

External links
 

1898 births
1986 deaths
American editors
20th-century American women writers
People from Erie County, Pennsylvania